This is a list of notable events in music that took place in the year 1915.

Specific locations
1915 in British music
1915 in Norwegian music

Specific genres
1915 in jazz

Events
March–December – The ukulele becomes popular as a result of its appearance in the Hawaiian Pavilion at the Panama–Pacific International Exposition in San Francisco.
May 15 – Tom Brown's band from New Orleans begin performing in Chicago, Illinois and start advertising themselves as a "Jass Band".
April 21 – Sibelius sees sixteen swans over Lake Tuusula which immediately inspires him to write the theme that becomes the finalé to his Symphony No. 5.
Summer – Claude Debussy composes at Pourville on the French Channel coast.
October 28 – Richard Strauss's symphonic poem An Alpine Symphony (Eine Alpensinfonie) is premiered by the orchestra of the Dresden Hofkapelle in Berlin under the composer's baton.
November 13 – First concert devoted to the work of Brazilian composer Heitor Villa-Lobos.
December 8 – Jean Sibelius conducts the world première of his Symphony No. 5 in Helsinki at a birthday concert for him.
December – Claude Debussy becomes one of the first people to receive a colostomy.
Composer Alban Berg enters service with the Austro-Hungarian Army.
Composer Herbert Howells is given six months to live, and becomes the first person in the UK to receive radium treatment (he will live on until 1983).
William Penfro Rowlands's hymn tune "Blaenwern" is first published in Henry H. Jones' Cân a Moliant.

Published popular music

 "Agitation Rag" by Robert Hampton
 "Alabama Jubilee" w.m. Jack Yellen & George L. Cobb
 "All For You" w. Henry Blossom m. Victor Herbert
 "Along The Rocky Road To Dublin" w. Joe Young m. Bert Grant
 "America, I Love You" w. Edgar Leslie m. Archie Gottler
 "Araby" w.m. Irving Berlin
 "Are You From Dixie?" w.m. Jack Yellen & George L. Cobb
 "Are You The O'Reilly? (Blime Me, O' Reilly, You Are Lookin' Well)" Rooney, Emmett
 "The Army Of Today's All Right" w.m. Kenneth Lyle & Fred W. Leigh
 "Auf Wiedersehen" w. Herbert Reynolds m. Sigmund Romberg, from the musical The Blue Paradise
 "Babes In The Wood"  w. Schuyler Greene & Jerome Kern m. Jerome Kern
 "Baby Shoes" w. Joe Goodwin & Ed Rose m. Al Piantadosi
 "Beatrice Fairfax, Tell Me What To Do" w.m. Grant Clarke, Joseph McCarthy, & James V. Monaco
 "Belgium Put the Kibosh on the Kaiser" w.m. Mark Sheridan
 "Blame It On The Blues" Doc Cooke
 "Canadian Capers" w. Earl Burnett m. Gus Chandler, Bert White & Henry Cohan
 "Cleopatra Rag" by Joseph Francis Lamb
 "Close To My Heart" by Andrew B. Sterling
 "Dear Old-Fashioned Irish Songs, My Mother Sang To Me" Bryan, Von Tilzer
 "Don't Bite The Hand That's Feeding You" w. Thomas Hoier m. James Morgan
 "Don't Take My Darling Boy Away" w. Will Dillon m. Albert Von Tilzer
 "Down In Bom-Bombay" w. Ballard MacDonald m. Harry Carroll
 "Everything In America Is Ragtime" w.m. Irving Berlin
 "Fascination" w.m. Harold Atteridge & Sigmund Romberg
 "Gasoline Gus And His Jitney Bus" Gay, Brown
 "The Girl On The Magazine Cover" w.m. Irving Berlin
 "Hello Frisco!"  w. Gene Buck m. Louis A. Hirsch
 "Hello, Hawaii, How Are You?" w. Bert Kalmar & Edgar Leslie m. Jean Schwartz
 "The Hesitating Blues"  w.m. W. C. Handy
 "I Can Beat You Doing What You're Doing Me" w.m. Clarence Williams & Armand J. Piron
 "I Didn't Raise My Boy To Be A Soldier" w. Alfred Bryan m. Al Piantadosi
 "I Love a Piano" w.m. Irving Berlin
 "I Wish I Was An Island In An Ocean Of Girls" w. Henry Blossom m. Victor Herbert
 "I'd Rather Be A Lamp-Post On Old Broadway" Benjamin Hapgood Burt
 "If I Can't Sing The Words, You Must Whistle The Tune" Herman Darewski
 "If We Can't Be The Same Old Sweethearts" w. Joe McCarthy m. James V. Monaco
 "I'm Simply Crazy Over You" w. William Jerome & E. Ray Goetz m. Jean Schwartz
 "In a Monastery Garden" m. Albert William Ketèlbey
 "Ireland Is Ireland To Me" w. Fiske O'Hara & J. Keirn Brennan m. Ernest R. Ball
 "It's Tulip Time In Holland" w. Dave Radford m. Richard A. Whiting
 "I've Been Floating Down the Old Green River" w. Bert Kalmar m. Joe Cooper
 "I've Gotta Go Back To Texas" Irving Berlin
 "Just Try To Picture Me (Back Home In Tennessee)" w. William Jerome m. Walter Donaldson
 "Keep the Home Fires Burning" w. Lena Guilbert Ford m. Ivor Novello (2nd edition, first under this title)
 "The Ladder Of Roses" w. R. H. Burnside m. Raymond Hubbell
 "The Little House Upon The Hill" w. Ballard MacDonald & Joe Goodwin m. Harry Puck
 "Love Is The Best Of All" w. Henry Blossom m. Victor Herbert
 "Love, Here Is My Heart" w. Adrian Ross m. Lãu Silésu
 "The Magic Melody" w. Schuyler Greene m. Jerome Kern
 "Memories" w. Gustave Kahn m. Egbert Van Alstyne
 "Molly Dear It's You I'm After" w. Frank Wood m. Henry E. Pether
 "M-O-T-H-E-R" w. Howard Johnson m. Theodore F. Morse
 "My Little Girl" w. Sam M. Lewis & William Dillon m. Albert Von Tilzer
 "My Mother's Rosary" w. Sam M. Lewis m. George W. Meyer
 "My Sweet Adair" w.m. L. Wolfe Gilbert & Anatole Friedland
 "Neapolitan Love Song" w. Henry Blossom Jr m. Victor Herbert
 "Nola" m. Felix Arndt
 "Norway" by Joe McCarthy
 "On The Beach At Waikiki" w. G. H. Stover m. Henry Kailimai
 "Pack Up Your Troubles in Your Old Kit-Bag" w. George Asaf m. Felix Powell
 "Paper Doll" w.m. Johnny S. Black
 "The Perfect Song" w. Clarence Lucas m. Joseph Carl Breil
 "Please Keep Out Of My Dreams" w.m. Elsa Maxwell
 "Ragging The Scale" w. Dave Ringle m. Edward B. Claypole
 "Ragtime Pipe of Pan" w.  Harold J. Atteridge m. Sigmund Romberg from the revue A World of Pleasure
 "Railroad Jim" by Nat H. Vincent
 "Ritual Fire Dance" m. Manuel de Falla
 "She's The Daughter Of Mother Machree" w. Jeff T. Branen m. Ernest R. Ball
 "Siam" w. Howard Johnson m. Fred Fisher
 "Some Little Bug Is Going To Find You" w. Benjamin Hapgood Burt & Roy Atwell m. Silvio Hein.  Introduced by Roy Atwell in the musical Alone at Last.
 "Some Sort Of Somebody" w. Elsie Janis m. Jerome Kern
 "Song Of The Islands" w.m. Charles E. King
 "That Hula Hula" w.m. Irving Berlin
 "There Must Be Little Cupids In The Briny" Jack Foley
 "There's A Broken Heart For Every Light On Broadway" w. Howard Johnson m. Fred Fisher
 "There's A Little Lane Without A Turning On The Way To Home Sweet Home" w. Sam M. Lewis m. George W. Meyer
 "Underneath The Stars" w. Fleta Jan Brown m. Herbert Spencer
 "We'll Have A Jubilee In My Old Kentucky Home" w. Coleman Goetz m. Walter Donaldson
 "Weary Blues" m. Artie Matthews
 "When I Get Back To The USA" w.m. Irving Berlin
 "When I Leave The World Behind" w.m. Irving Berlin
 "When Old Bill Bailey Plays The Ukulele" w.m. Charles McCarron & Nat Vincent
 "When You're In Love With Someone" w.m. Grant Clarke & Al Piantadosi
 "Which Switch Is The Switch, Miss, For Ipswich?" David, Barnett & Darewski
 "You Can't Mend A Broken Heart" by Shelton Brooks
 "You Know And I Know" w. Schuyler Greene m. Jerome Kern
 "You'll Always Be The Same Sweet Girl" w. Andrew B. Sterling m. Harry Von Tilzer

Hit recordings
 "Carry Me Back to Old Virginny" by Alma Gluck
 "It's a Long Way to Tipperary" by John McCormack
 "I Didn't Raise My Boy to be a Soldier" by Morton Harvey
 "Keep the Home Fires Burning" by James F. Harrison

Classical music
Béla Bartók
Romanian Folk Dances
Sonatina
Alban Berg – Three Pieces for Orchestra (Drei Orchesterstücke; first performed 1923/30)
Frank Bridge 
Novelletten, H.44 (first published, composed 1904)
String Quartet No.2, H.115
Lament, H.117
Harry Thacker Burleigh 
5 Songs of Laurence Hope
Ethiopia Saluting the Colors
John Alden Carpenter
Adventures in a Perambulator (first performed)
Concertino for piano and orchestraImpromptu for pianoPolonaise Américaine for piano
Claude DebussyEn blanc et noir for two pianos
Études for solo piano (two books of 6)
Sonata for cello and piano in D minor
Sonata for flute, viola and harp (first performed 1916)
George Enescu – Orchestral Suite No. 2 in C major, Op. 20
Manuel de FallaEl amor brujo (gitanería version for cante flamenco, actors and chamber orchestra)Nights in the Gardens of Spain (Noches en los jardines de España; first performed 1916)
Enrique Granados – 2 Danzas Españolas, Op.37
Jesús Guridi – Así cantan los chicosCharles Ives
Piano Sonata No. 2, Concord, Mass., 1840–60 (first published 1919)
String Quartet No. 2 (first performed 1946)
Zoltán Kodály – Sonata for Solo Cello, Op. 8
Egon Kornauth – Phantasie Op.10 
Federico Mompou – L'Hora Gris ("Grey Hour")
Manuel Ponce – Balada MexicanaSergei Prokofiev – Scythian Suite (first performed 1916)
Sergei Rachmaninoff – All-Night Vigil (Всенощное бдѣніе, Vsénoshchnoye bdéniye)
Max RegerVariationen und Fuge über ein Thema von Beethoven, Op. 86
3 Cello Suites, Op. 131c
3 Viola Suites, Op. 131d
Violin Sonata No.9, Op.139
String Trio No. 2 in D minor, Op. 141b
Requiem, Op. 144b
Jean Sibelius
Impromptu, Op. 78Jäger March (Jääkärien marssi), Op. 91a, for male chorus and symphony orchestra
Symphony No. 5 in E-flat major, Op. 82
Charles Villiers Stanford – Piano Concerto No.2, Op.126, premiered June 3 in Norfolk, Connecticut
Wilhelm Stenhammar – Symphony No. 2 in G minor
Richard Strauss – An Alpine SymphonyKarol SzymanowskiMétopes, for pianoMythes, for violin and pianoSongs of a Fairy-Tale Princess, for voice and piano3 Songs on Words by Dmitri Davydov, for voice and piano
Gabriel Verdalle – Impromptu No.2
Heitor Villa-Lobos
Cello Concerto no. 1Danças Características Africanas for pianoDesesperança – Sonata Phantastica e Capricciosa No. 1 for violin and pianoElégie for orchestraSuíte graciosa (revised in 1946 as String Quartet No. 1)
String Quartet No. 2
Trio for piano and strings No. 2
Siegfried Wagner – Violin Concerto
Heinrich Weinreis – Es kommt ein Schiff geladen
Géza Zichy – Liebestraum

Opera
Rutland Boughton – BethlehemUmberto Giordano – Madame Sans-GeneEmmerich Kálmán – Die Csárdásfürstin premiered November 17 in Vienna

Jazz

Musical theater
 Alone at Last Broadway production opened at the Shubert Theatre on October 14 and ran for 180 performances
 Betty London production opened at Daly's Theatre on April 24 and ran for 391 performances
 The Blue Paradise Broadway production opened at the Casino Theatre on August 5 and ran for 356 performances.
 Bric-A-Brac London production opened at the Palace Theatre on September 18.
 5064 Gerrard London revue opened at the Alhambra Theatre on March 19.
 Hip-Hip-Hooray Broadway revue opened at the Hippodrome Theatre on September 30 and ran for 425 performances.
 Maid in America Broadway production opened at the Winter Garden Theatre on February 18 and ran for 108 performances.
 The Only Girl London production opened at the Apollo Theatre on September 25 and ran for 107 performances.
 The Passing Show Of 1915 Broadway revue opened at the Winter Garden Theatre on May 29 and ran for 145 performances.
 Shell Out London production opened at the Comedy Theatre on August 24 and ran for 315 performances.
 Stop! Look! Listen! Broadway production opened at the Globe Theatre on December 25 and ran for 105 performances.
 Tonight's The Night London production opened at the Gaiety Theatre on April 18 and ran for 460 performances.
 Very Good Eddie Broadway production opened at the Princess Theatre on December 23 and ran for 341 performances
 A World of Pleasure Broadway revue opened at the Winter Garden Theatre on October 14 and ran for 116 performances.
 Ziegfeld Follies Of 1915 Broadway revue opened at the New Amsterdam Theatre on June 21 and ran for 104 performances

Births
January 1 – Fulgencio Aquino, Venezuelan harpist and composer (d. 1994)
January 6 – Bob Copper, English folk singer (d. 2004)
January 25 – Ewan MacColl, English folk singer and songwriter (d. 1989)
January 27 – Jack Brymer, English clarinettist (d. 2003)
January 29 – John Serry, Sr., US concert accordionist, composer & arranger (d. 2003)
January 30 – Dorothy Dell, actress and singer (d. 1934)
January 31 – Alan Lomax, US folklorist and musicologist (d. 2002)
February 4 – Ray Evans, US songwriter (d. 2007)
February 18 – Marcel Landowski, French composer, biographer and arts administrator (d. 1999)
March 4 – Carlos Surinach, Spanish composer (d. 1997)
March 10 – Charles Groves, English conductor (d. 1992)
March 14 – Alexander Brott, Canadian conductor and composer (d. 2005)
March 20
Sviatoslav Richter, pianist (d. 1997)
Sister Rosetta Tharpe, gospel singer (d. 1973)
March 25 – Dorothy Squires, Welsh singer (d. 1998)
March 27 – Robert Lockwood, Jr., US Delta blues guitarist (d. 2006)
March 28 – Jay Livingston, songwriter (d. 2001)
March 29 – George Chisholm, Scottish-born jazz trombonist and comedian (d. 1997)
April 4 – Muddy Waters (born McKinley Morganfield), African American blues musician (d. 1983)
April 7 – Billie Holiday (born Eleanora Fagan), African American blues singer (d. 1959)
April 12 – Hound Dog Taylor, African American blues guitarist (d. 1975)
April 29 – Donald Mills, US singer of the Mills Brothers (d. 1999)
May 5 – Alice Faye, US actress and singer (d. 1998)
May 8 – Nan Wynn, US singer (d. 1971)
May 25 – Ginny Simms, US singer (d. 1994)
May 27
Esther Soré, Chilean musician (d. 1996)
Midge Williams, African American jazz singer (d. 1952)
June 1 – Bart Howard, composer and pianist (d. 2004)
June 9 – Les Paul, US musician, inventor of the solid body electric guitar (d. 2009)
June 12 – Priscilla Lane, US singer and actress (d. 1995)
June 17 – David "Stringbean" Akeman, US country musician (d. 1973)
June 18 – Vic Legley, Dutch composer (d. 1994)
June 22 – Randolph Henning Hokanson, pianist (died 2018)
June 28 – David Honeyboy Edwards, US blues musician (d. 2011)
July 1 – Willie Dixon, US blues musician (d. 1992)
July 9 – David Diamond, classical composer (d. 2005)
July 15 – Frankie Yankovic, polka musician (d. 1998)
July 22 – Armando Renzi (it), composer (died 1985)
July 23 – Emmett Berry, jazz trumpeter (d. 1993)
July 28 – Frankie Yankovic, accordionist and polka musician (d. 1998)
July 31 – George Forrest, musical theatre writer (d. 1999)
August 6 – Jacques Abram, pianist (d. 1998)
August 9 – Haim Alexander, Israeli composer (d. 2012)
August 24 – Wynonie Harris, US singer (d. 1969)
August 26 – Humphrey Searle, English composer (d. 1982)
August 30 – Robert Strassburg, US classical composer (d. 2003)
September 3
Knut Nystedt, Norwegian classical composer (d. 2014)
Memphis Slim (born John Chatman), African American blues musician (d. 1988)
September 5 – Florencio Morales Ramos, singer, trovador and composer (d. 1989)
September 12 – Billy Daniels, US singer (d. 1988)
September 23 – Julius Baker, flautist (d. 2003)
September 24 – Ettore Gracis, conductor (d. 1992)
October 10 – Sweets Edison, jazz trumpeter (d. 1999)
October 31 – Jane Jarvis, jazz pianist and composer (d. 2010)
November 5 – Myron Floren, accordionist (d. 2005)
November 9 – Hanka Bielicka, Polish singer and actress (d. 2006)
November 14 – Billy Bauer, cool jazz guitarist (d. 2005)
November 26 – Earl Wild, pianist (d. 2010)
November 29 – Billy Strayhorn, jazz composer, pianist, arranger, lyricist and collaborator with Duke Ellington (d. 1967) 
November 30 – Brownie McGhee, US Piedmont blues musician (d. 1996)
December 12 – Frank Sinatra, US singer and actor (d. 1998)
December 14 – Dan Dailey, US singer and actor (d. 1978)
December 16 – Georgy Sviridov, Russian/Soviet composer (d. 1998)
December 17 – André Claveau, singer (d. 2003)
December 19 – Édith Piaf, French singer (d. 1963)
December 25 – Pete Rugolo, Italian-born US pianist and bandleader (d 2011)

Deaths
January 2 
Karl Goldmark, Hungarian composer (b. 1830)
Bertha Tammelin, Swedish mezzo-soprano singer and actress (b. 1836)
January 5 – Jeanne Gerville-Réache, French operatic contralto (b. 1882)
January 21 – Louis Gregh, French composer and publisher (b. 1843)
January 22 – Anna Bartlett Warner, songwriter (b. 1827)
January 25 – Rudolf Tillmetz, flute virtuoso, pedagogue and composer (b. 1847)
February 5 – Paul Collin, translator and lyricist (born 1843)
February 12
Fanny Crosby, hymn-writer (b. 1820)
Emile Waldteufel, composer (b. 1837)
March 12 – Heinrich Schülz-Beuthen, composer (b. 1838)
March 19 – Franz Xaver Neruda, cellist and composer (b. 1843)
April 27 – Alexander Scriabin, composer (b. 1872) (sepsis)
May 7 – Charles Frohman, Broadway producer (b. 1856) (drowned in sinking of the RMS Lusitania)
June 2 – Botho Sigwart, composer (born 1884)
June 9 – Enrico Rocca, violin maker (b. 1847)
June 10 – William Hayman Cummings, organist and singer (b. 1831)
June 19 – Sergei Taneyev, pianist and composer (b. 1856)
June 25 – Rafael Joseffy, pianist and composer (b. 1852)
September 15 – Isidor Bajić, composer (b. 1878)
September 29 – Rudi Stephan, composer (b. 1887) (killed in action)
October 2 – Russell Alexander, entertainer and composer (b. 1877)
October 5 – Otto Malling, organist and composer (b. 1848)
October 22 – Adèle Isaac, operatic soprano (b. 1854)
October 26 – August Bungert, German composer and poet (b. 1845)
November 12 – Jean-Charles Delioux, French composer (born 1825)
November 14 – Teodor Leszetycki, pianist and composer (b. 1830)
November 27 – Sigismund Zaremba, Russian composer (b. 1861)
c. December 1 – Henry Hart, African American entertainer and composer (b. 1839)
December 3 – Lewis F. Muir, American composer of ragtime (born 1883)
December 4 – Gustav Hollaender, German composer (b. 1855)
December 10 – David Jenkins, Welsh choral composer (b. 1848)date unknown''
Billy Kersands, African American dancer (b. c. 1842)
José María Usandizaga, Spanish Basque composer (b. 1887) (tuberculosis)

References

 
20th century in music
Music by year